St. Archangel Michael Skete is considered the oldest Eastern Orthodox monastery in North America, a men's monastic institution started by Father Herman of Alaska more than 200 years ago. He was called a saint by the people long before the church recognized him as such. The Monk's Lagoon on Spruce Island in Ouzinkie, Alaska is the site of the home and grave of St. Herman of Alaska. The icon of this man, "protector of the Natives", "caretaker of the sick during the most severe epidemics", "helper of those in need", "always there when one needed spiritual help", will be found today in every Christian Orthodox home in Alaska. St. Archangel Michael Skete is under the omophorion of Bishop Maksim Vasiljević of the Serbian Orthodox Eparchy of Western America.

Kodiak Island is the place where the first Russian monastery on the North American continent was first erected in 1794 while still part of Imperial Russia. In 1808, Herman of Alaska established his hermitage on Spruce Island. Today, the North American saint's original dwelling is preserved by the monastics of St. Archangel Michael Skete, located in Sunny Cove on Spruce Island.

The Orthodox monks on Spruce island are isolated from the coast like the Orthodox nuns on St. Nilus Island Skete. The primary means of transportation for the monks living in isolation from the mainland communities (since 1983) is a 21-foot aluminum skiff dubbed the "Archangel". The handful of monks use their boat to go off to sea to fish. In the summer, there is a "dinner boat cruise" for visitors from Kodiak that includes St. Nilus Island Skete on their itinerary as well.

See also
 St. Nilus Island Skete
 St. Sava Serbian Orthodox Monastery, located at the Episcopal headquarters of the Serbian Orthodox Eparchy of Eastern America, Libertyville, Illinois
 New Gračanica Monastery, located at the Episcopal headquarters of the Serbian Orthodox Eparchy of New Gračanica and Midwestern America, Third Lake, Illinois
 St. Steven's Serbian Orthodox Cathedral, located at the Episcopal headquarters of the Serbian Orthodox Eparchy of Western America, Alhambra, California
 The Holy Transfiguration Monastery, located at the Episcopal headquarters of the Serbian Orthodox Eparchy of Canada, Milton, Ontario, Canada
 Episcopal headquarters of the Serbian Orthodox Eparchy of Buenos Aires and South America, Buenos Aires, Argentina
 Monastery of St. Paisius, Safford
 St. Pachomious Monastery
 St. Xenia Serbian Orthodox Skete
 Saint Herman of Alaska Monastery
 St. Mark Serbian Orthodox Monastery

References 

Serbian Orthodox monasteries in the United States
1808 establishments in the United States